Khaled Abou el Fadl (born October 23, 1963) is the Omar and Azmeralda Alfi Distinguished Professor of Law at the UCLA School of Law where he has taught courses on International Human Rights, Islamic jurisprudence, National Security Law, Law and Terrorism, Islam and Human Rights, Political Asylum, and Political Crimes and Legal Systems.  He is also the founder of the Usuli Institute, a non-profit public charity dedicated to research and education to promote humanistic interpretations of Islam, as well as the Chair of the Islamic Studies Program at the University of California, Los Angeles.  He has lectured on and taught Islamic law in the United States and Europe in academic and non-academic environments since approximately 1990.

Abou El Fadl is the author of numerous books and articles on topics in Islam and Islamic law. He has appeared on national and international television and radio, and published in such publications as The New York Times, The Washington Post, The Wall Street Journal, The Los Angeles Times, and The Boston Review. His work has been translated into several languages including Arabic, Persian, Indonesian, French, Norwegian, Dutch, Russian, Vietnamese and Japanese.

Education

Abou El Fadl holds a B.A. in Political Science from Yale University, a J.D. from the University of Pennsylvania Law School, and an M.A. and Ph.D. in Islamic law from Princeton University.  Abou El Fadl also has 13 years of instruction in Islamic jurisprudence, grammar and rhetoric in Egypt and Kuwait.  After law school, he clerked for Arizona Supreme Court Justice James Moeller, and practiced immigration and investment law in the U.S. and the Middle East. He previously taught Islamic law at the University of Texas School of Law at Austin, Yale Law School and Princeton University.

Views

Abou El Fadl believes that the usuli tradition "naturally leads Islam" to an ethical humanism, or a set of ideas about justice and beauty that help to achieve God's will.  He has criticized puritanical and Wahhabi Islam for, among other things, its lack of interest in morality, which the Wahhabis argue "shouldn't affect the implementation of Koranic law."

Abou El Fadl has described the terrorism of 9/11 attacks as the logical conclusion of "a puritanical and ethically oblivious form of Islam [that] has predominated since the 1970s" and been promoted by religious authorities in Saudi Arabia and other countries, including the U.S. and Europe. He supports religious and cultural pluralism, democratic values and women's rights.

He would like to return to the "Golden Age of Islam" where "numerous traditions" emphasized that the "pursuit of knowledge is an act of permanent worship" and to abandon the current state of affairs where "rampant apologetics" of Muslim thinkers has "produced a culture that eschews self-critical and introspective insight and embraces projection of blame and a fantasy-like level of confidence and arrogance."

Awards and appointments
Abou el Fadl was awarded the University of Oslo Human Rights Award, 
the Leo and Lisl Eitinger Prize in 2007, and named a Carnegie Scholar in Islamic Law in 2005.

He has served on the U.S. Commission on International Religious Freedom, and Board of Directors of Human Rights Watch.  He continues to serve on the Advisory Board of Middle East Watch (part of Human Rights Watch) and works with human rights organizations such as Amnesty International and the Lawyers' Committee for Human Rights (Human Rights First) in cases involving human rights, terrorism, political asylum, and international and commercial law.  
In 2005, he was listed as one of LawDragon's Top 500 Lawyers in the Nation. He has been listed in the Arabian Business Power 500 List of the World's Most Influential Arabs (2011, 2012).

He is the founding Advisory Board Member of the UCLA Journal of Islamic and Near Eastern Law (JINEL), and an Editorial Board Member for Political Theology, the Journal of Religious Ethics, the Journal of Islamic Law and Society, the Journal of Islamic Law and Culture, and Hawa: Journal of Women of Middle East and the Islamic World.  He also serves as an Advisory Board member for the University of Adelaide Research Unit for the Study of Society, Law and Religion (RUSSLR) in Australia; the Carnegie Corporation of New York's Islam Initiative Publications Project; the Harvard Press Series on Islamic Law; and the Journal of Islamic Studies (Islamabad).

Publications
His recent works focus on authority, human rights, democracy and beauty in Islam and Islamic law.  His book, The Great Theft, delineated key differences between moderate and extremist Muslims, and was named one of the Top 100 Books of the year by Canadian newspaper The Globe and Mail.

Books 
 The Prophet's Pulpit: Commentaries on the State of Islam (Usili Press, 18 April 2022) ISBN  1957063025
 Reasoning with God: Reclaiming Shari'ah in the Modern Age (Rowman & Littlefield Publishers, Inc., 2014) ISBN  0742552322
 The Search for Beauty in Islam: Conference of the Books (Rowman & Littlefield Publishers, Inc., 2006) ISBN  0761819495
 The Great Theft: Wrestling Islam from the Extremists (Harper San Francisco, 2005) ISBN  0061189030
 Islam and the Challenge of Democracy (Princeton University Press, 2004) ISBN  0691119384
 The Place of Tolerance in Islam (Beacon Press, 2002) ISBN  0807002291
 And God Knows the Soldiers: The Authoritative and Authoritarian in Islamic Discourses (UPA/Rowman and Littlefield, 2001) ISBN  0761820841
 Speaking in God's Name: Islamic law, Authority and Women (Oneworld Press, Oxford, 2001) ISBN  1851682627
 Conference of the Books: The Search for Beauty in Islam (University Press of America/Rowman and Littlefield, 2001) ISBN  0761819495
 Rebellion and Violence in Islamic Law (Cambridge University Press, 2001) ISBN  0521880521
 The Authoritative and Authoritarian in Islamic Discourses (Dar Taiba, 1997) ISBN  1891226002

Selected academic articles 

 "Conceptualizing Shari‘a in the Modern State", 56 Villanova Law Review 4 (2012).
 "The Language of the Age: Shari'a and Natural Justice in the Egyptian Revolution" in: Law in the Aftermath of the Egyptian Revolution of 25 January (Harvard International Law Journal online, April 25, 2011).
 "The Centrality of Shari'ah to Government and Constitutionalism in Islam" in: Constitutionalism in Islamic Countries: Between Upheaval and Continuity (eds. Rainer Grote / Tilmann Röder, Oxford University Press, 2011).
 "Fascism Triumphant?" Political Theology 10, no. 4 (2009), pp. 577–581 
 "Islamic Authority" in: New Directions in Islamic Thought: Exploring Reform and Muslim Tradition (eds. Kari Vogt, Lena Miller and Christian Moe, London: I.B. Tauris, 2009).
 "Islamic Law, Human Rights and Neo-Colonialism" in: Oxford Amnesty Lectures 2006: The 'War on Terror''' (eds. Chris Miller, Manchester University Press, 2009).
 "The Unique and International and the Imperative of Discourse", 8 Chicago Journal of International Law, pp. 43–57 (2007).
 "Forward" in: In Inside the Gender Jihad: Women's Reform in Islam by Amina Wadud. Oxford: Oneworld Publications, 2006, pp. vii–xiv.
 "Islam and Violence: Our Forgotten Legacy" in: Islam in Transition (eds. John Donohue and John Esposito. New York, NY: Oxford University Press, 2006, pp. 460–464).
 "The Crusader", Boston Review 28, no. 2 (March/April 2006).
 "The Place of Ethical Obligations in Islamic Law", UCLA Journal of Islamic and Near Eastern Law, no. 4 (2005): pp. 1–40.
 "Introduction" in: With God on our Side: Politics and Theology of the War on Terrorism, London: Amal Press, 2005, pp. xli–xlv.
 "A distinctly Islamic View of Human Rights: Does it exist and is it compatible with the Universal Declaration of Human Rights?", Vol. 27, No. 2, Center for Strategic and International Studies (CSIS) 27, 2005.
 "Islam and the Challenge of Democratic Commitment", in: Does Human Rights Need God? (eds. Elizabeth M. Bucar and Barbra Barnett. Wm. B. Eerdmans Publishing Co., Cambridge, U.K., 2005, pp. 58–103). 
 Encyclopedia of Religion and Nature, s.v. "Dogs in the Islamic Tradition and Nature." New York: Continuum International, 2005.
 "Speaking, Killing and Loving in God's Name", The Hedgehog Review 6, no. 1 (Spring 2004) 
 "The Death Penalty, Mercy and Islam: A Call for Retrospection" in: A Call for Reckoning: Religion and the Death Penalty (eds. Erik C. Owens, John D. Carlson & Eric P. Elshtain. Grand Rapids, MI: Wm. B. Eerdmans Publishing Co., 2004, pp. 73–105).
 "Islam and the Challenge of Democratic Commitment", Fordham International Law Journal 27, no. 1 (December 2003): pp. 4–71.
 "9/11 and the Muslim Transformation", in: September 11: A Transformative Moment? Culture, Religion and Politics in an Age of Uncertainty (edited by Mary Dudziak. Duke University Press, 2003, pp. 70–111).
 "The Human Rights Commitment in Modern Islam", in: Human Rights and Responsibilities in the World Religions (eds. Joseph Runzo, Nancy M. Martin and Arvind Sharma. Oxford: Oneworld Publications, 2003, pp. 301–364).
 "The Modern Ugly and the Ugly Modern: Reclaiming the Beautiful in Islam" in: Progressive Muslims (edited by Omid Safi. Oxford: Oneworld Publications, 2003, pp. 33–77) 
 "Islam and the State: A Short History" in: Democracy and Islam in the New Constitution of Afghanistan (eds. Cheryl Benard and Nina Hachigian. Conference Proceedings, Rand Corporation and Center for Asia Pacific Policy, March, 2003).
 "The Culture of Ugliness in Modern Islam and Reengaging Morality", UCLA Journal of Islamic and Near Eastern Law 2, no. 1 (Fall/Winter 2002–03): 33–97.
 "The Orphans of Modernity and the Clash of Civilisations", Global Dialogue, vol. 4, no. 2 (Spring 2002), pp. 1–16.
 "Introduction" in: Shattered Illusions: Analyzing the War on Terrorism, London: Amal Press, 2002, pp. 19–44. 
 "Peaceful Jihad" in: Taking Back Islam (edited by Michael Wolfe. Emmaus, PA: Rodale Press, 2002, pp. 33–39) 
 "Islamic Law and Ambivalent Scholarship: A Review of Lawrence Rosen, The Justice of Islam: Comparative Perspectives on Islamic Law and Society" (Oxford: Oxford University Press, 2000). Michigan Law Review, vol. 100, no. 6, May 2002, pp. 1421–1443.
 "Soul Searching and the Spirit of Shari'ah: A Review of Bernard Weiss' The Spirit of Islamic Law." Washington University Global Studies Law Review, vol. 1, nos. 1 and 2, Winter/Summer 2002, pp. 553–72.
 "Between Functionalism and Morality: The Juristic Debates on the Conduct of War" in: Islamic Ethics of Life: Abortion, War, and Euthanasia (edited by Jonathan E. Brockopp. University of South Carolina Press, Columbia, SC: 2003, pp. 103–128).
 "Islam and the Challenge of Democracy", Boston Review 28, no. 2 (April/May 2003).
 "Conflict Resolution as a Normative Value in Islamic Law: Handling Disputes with Non-Muslims" in: Faith-Based Diplomacy: Trumping Realpolitik (edited by Douglas Johnston. New York: Oxford University Press, 2003, pp. 178–209).
 "The Unbounded Law of God and Territorial Boundaries" in: States, Nations and Borders: The Ethics of Making Boundaries (eds. Allen Buchanan and Margaret Moore. Cambridge: Cambridge University Press, 2003, pp. 214–227).
 "Constitutionalism and the Islamic Sunni Legacy", UCLA Journal of Islamic and Near Eastern Law 1, no. 1 (Fall/Winter 2001–02): pp. 67–101.
 "Islam and Tolerance: Abou El Fadl Replies", Boston Review 27, no. 1 (February/March 2002): pp. 51.
 "The Place of Tolerance in Islam", Boston Review 26, no. 6 (December 2001/January 2002): pp. 34–36. Translated into Arabic for publication in Al-Rashad.
 "Islam and the Theology of Power", Middle East Report 221 (Winter 2001): pp. 28–33.
 "What Became of Tolerance in Islam" in: Beauty for Ashes (Edited by John Farina. New York, NY: Crossroad Publishing Company, 2001, pp. 71–75).
 "Negotiating Human Rights Through Language", UCLA Journal of International Law and Foreign Affairs 5, no. 2 (2001): 229–236.
 "Fox Hunting, Pheasant Shooting and Comparative Law', Co-authored with Alan Watson. American Journal of Comparative Law 48 (2000): 1–37.
 "The Use and Abuse of Holy War. A Review of James Johnson's, The Holy War Idea in the Western & Islamic Traditions." Ethics and International Affairs 14 (2000): pp. 133–140.
 "The Rules of Killing at War: An Inquiry into Classical Sources", The Muslim World 89, no. 2 (1999): pp. 144–157.
 "Striking the Balance: Islamic Legal Discourse on Muslim Minorities" in: Muslims on the Americanization Path? (eds. Yvonne Haddad and John Esposito. Atlanta, GA.: Scholars Press, 1998; Oxford: Oxford University Press, 1999).
 "Political Crime in Islamic Jurisprudence and Western Legal History", UC Davis Journal of International Law and Policy 4 (1998): pp. 1 – 28.
 "Muslims and Accessible Jurisprudence in Liberal Democracies: A Response to Edward B. Foley's Jurisprudence and Theology", Fordham Law Review 66 (1998): pp. 1227–1231.
 "Muslim Minorities and Self-Restraint in Liberal Democracies", Loyola Law Review 29, no. 4 1996, pp. 1525–1542.
 "Democracy in Islamic Law" in: Under Siege: Islam and Democracy (edited by Richard Bulliet. New York: Middle East Institute of Columbia University, 1994).
 "Islamic Law and Muslim Minorities: The Juristic Discourse on Muslim Minorities from the Second/Eighth to the Eleventh/Seventeenth Centuries", Islamic Law and Society 1, no. 2 (1994): pp. 141–187.
 "Legal Debates on Muslim Minorities: Between Rejection and Accommodation", Journal of Religious Ethics 22, no. 1, (1994): pp. 127–162.
 "Tax Farming in Islamic Law: A Search for a Concept", Islamic Studies 31, no. 1 (1992): pp. 5 – 32.
 "The Common and Islamic Law of Duress", Arab Law Quarterly 6, no. 2 (1991): 121–159; and Islamic Studies 30, no. 3 (1991): pp. 305–350.
 "Ahkam al-Bughat: Irregular Warfare and the Law of Rebellion in Islam" in: Cross, Crescent & Sword: The Justification and Limitation of War in Western and Islamic Tradition (eds. James Turner Johnson and John Kelsay. Westport, CT.: Greenwood Press, 1990).

 Other 

 "The Tragedy of Great Power: The Massacre of Gaza and the Inevitable Failure of the Arab Spring", Australian Broadcasting Corporation (August 2014) 
 "Why the West Stays Silent: The Disquieting Case of Khaled al-Qazzaz", Australian Broadcasting Corporation (July 2014) 
 "Who's Afraid of the Islamists? From Attaturk to al-Sisi, from John Dewey to Fox News", Australian Broadcasting Corporation (May 2014) 
 "A State of Grace: Defending Human Rights against Terrorism and Secular Nationalism", Australian Broadcasting Corporation (January 2014) 
 "Dominating religion in Egypt's pseudo-secular state", Australian Broadcasting Corporation (September 2013) 
 "Egypt, wake up and smell the money", Australian Broadcasting Corporation (September 2013) 
 "Egypt in the Twilight Zone", Huffington Post (September 2013) 
 "I Mourn Egypt", Huffington Post (July 2013) 
 "The collapse of legitimacy: How Egypt's secular intelligentsia betrayed the revolution", Australian Broadcasting Corporation (July 2013) 
 "Egypt: Is political Islam dead?" Al-Jazeera (July 2013) 
 "The Perils of a ‘People's Coup'" New York Times (July 2013)  
 "Did the military really save Egypt?" Australian Broadcasting Corporation (July 2013) 
 "Renewing Islam in these Dark Ages", Australian Broadcasting Corporation (August 2011) 
 "Islam and Vulgarity in the Modern Age", Australian Broadcasting Company 
"The Emergence of Supremacist Puritanism in Modern Islam", Australian Broadcasting Company 
 "Which Clash? What Civilizations?", Australian Broadcasting Company 
 "The Culture of Ugliness in Modern Islam", Australian Broadcasting Company 
 "What is Shari'a", Australian Broadcasting Company 
 "The Narcissistic Delusions of Hosni Mubarak", Australian Broadcasting Company 
 "The Nature of Law and Morality", Policy Research Center, Islamic Foundation, Islamic Society of Britain 
 "More of the Same: Obama in Cairo", Political Theology Online 
 "Obama in Cairo" Commentary, Religion and Ethics Newsweekly, June 4, 2009 
 "Fascism Triumphant?" Translated into Dutch. Opinion, VolZin, The Netherlands, Issue 15, August 7, 2009.
 "Al-Qaeda and Saudi Arabia",  Opinion, Wall Street Journal, November 10, 2003.
 "On Rebuilding Iraq", Opinion, Wall Street Journal, April 21, 2003.
 "Past year has been difficult for American Muslims", Editorial, Dallas Morning News, September 8, 2002. 
 "US Muslims, Unite and Stand Up", Editorial, Los Angeles Times, July 14, 2002.
 "Moderate Muslims Under Siege", Editorial, New York Times, July 1, 2002.
 "What Became of Tolerance in Islam?" Editorial, Los Angeles Times, September 14, 2001 
 "Terrorism is at Odds With Islamic Tradition", Editorial, Los Angeles Times, August 22, 2001. 
 "Islamic Sex Laws", LA Daily Journal, August 15, 1999.
 "Human Rights Must Include Tolerance", Los Angeles Times'', August 12, 1997.

Notes 

 Fresh Air Interview, 2003 (NPR)

External links 
 Facebook Page
 Khaled Abou El Fadl, UCLA Faculty Page
 

1963 births
Living people
Male feminists
Muslim reformers
UCLA School of Law faculty
University of Pennsylvania Law School alumni
Yale College alumni
Princeton University alumni
Sunni fiqh scholars
Kuwaiti emigrants to the United States
Islamic feminism
American Islamic studies scholars
Critics of Wahhabism
Muslim scholars of Islamic studies